Western Pennsylvania English, known more narrowly as Pittsburgh English or popularly as Pittsburghese, is a dialect of American English native primarily to the western half of Pennsylvania, centered on the city of Pittsburgh, but potentially appearing in some speakers as far north as Erie County, as far west as Youngstown, Ohio, and as far south as Clarksburg, West Virginia. Commonly associated with the working class of Pittsburgh, users of the dialect are colloquially known as "Yinzers".

Overview
Scots-Irish, Pennsylvania Dutch, Polish, Ukrainian and Croatian immigrants to the area all provided certain loanwords to the dialect (see "Vocabulary" below). Many of the sounds and words found in the dialect are popularly thought to be unique to Pittsburgh, but that is a misconception since the dialect resides throughout the greater part of western Pennsylvania and the surrounding areas. Central Pennsylvania, currently an intersection of several dialect regions, was identified in 1949 by Hans Kurath as a subregion between western and eastern Pennsylvania, but some scholars have more recently identified it within the western Pennsylvania dialect region. Since Kurath's study, one of western Pennsylvania's defining features, the cot–caught merger, has expanded into central Pennsylvania, moving eastward until being blocked at Harrisburg. Perhaps the only feature whose distribution is restricted almost exclusively to the immediate vicinity of Pittsburgh is  monophthongization in which words such as house, down, found, and sauerkraut are sometimes pronounced with an "ah" sound, instead of the more standard pronunciation of "ow", rendering eye spellings such as hahs, dahn, fahnd, and sahrkraht.

Speakers of Pittsburgh English are sometimes called "Yinzers" in reference to their use of the second-person plural pronoun "yinz." The word "yinzer" is sometimes heard as pejorative, indicating a lack of sophistication, but the term is now used in a variety of ways. Older men are more likely to use the accent than women "possibly because of a stronger interest in displaying local identity...."

Phonology

As in most other American dialects, the father–bother merger also occurs. Therefore, cot and caught are both pronounced ; Don and dawn are both .

It may also occur before , as in start  or car , but a more common pronunciation is back and rounded:  etc. The vowel in hoarse is the same as the one in horse, phonetically :  but phonemically  due to the cot-caught merger: .

The  vowel often has an unrounded central or fronted starting point in Pittsburgh: .

The  vowel typically begins front in the mouth .

The  vowel alone undergoes Canadian raising to  before voiceless consonants, as in ice .

The monophthongization does not occur, however, in word-final positions (how, now), and the diphthong then remains . That is one of the few features, if not the only one, restricted almost exclusively to western Pennsylvania in North America, but it can sometimes be found in other accents of the English-speaking world, such as Cockney and South African English. The sound may be the result of contact from Slavic languages during the early 20th century. Monophthongization also occurs for the sound , as in eye, before liquid consonants,  so that tile is pronounced ; pile is pronounced ; and iron is pronounced . That phenomenon allows tire to merge with the sound of tar: .

The  vowel (phonemically an  sequence) is phonetically close-mid .

 notes a tendency to diphthongize  to  not only before nasals (as in GenAm) but also before all voiced consonants (as in bad ) and voiceless fricatives (as in grass ). This has since been reversed and now  is confined to the environment of a following nasal, matching the GenAm allophony.

A number of vowel mergers occur uniquely in Western Pennsylvania English before the consonant . The pair of vowels  and  may merge before the  consonant, cause both steel and still to be pronounced as something like . Similarly, and  may merge before , so that  pool, pull, and pole may merge to something like . The  merger is found in western Pennsylvania, as well as parts of the southern United States, including Alabama, Texas and the west (McElhinny 1999). On the other hand, the  merger is consistently found only in western Pennsylvania. The  merger towards  may also appear before : eagle then sounds to outsiders like iggle.

The phenomenon is also common in African-American English.

Western Pennsylvania English speakers may use falling intonation at the end of questions, for example, in "Are you painting your garage?"  (with pitch rising in intonation up to just before the last syllable and then falling precipitously). Such speakers typically use falling pitch for yes-no questions for which they already are quite sure of the answer. A speaker uttering the above example is simply confirming what is already thought: yes, the person spoken to is painting his/her garage. It is most common in areas of heavy German settlement, especially southeastern Pennsylvania, hence its nickname, the "Pennsylvania Dutch question", but it is also found elsewhere in Pennsylvania, including Pittsburgh (Maxfield 1931; Layton 1999; Wisnosky 2003; Johnstone, Andrus and Danielson 2006). It is of German origin.

Vocabulary

babushka - (n.) headscarf
buggy - (n.) shopping cart
baby buggy - (n.) baby carriage
the 'Burgh - (n.) Pittsburgh
beal - (v.) to fester or suppurate
bealed - (adj.) usually of an ear: infected or abscessed
belling - (n.) noisy celebration or mock serenade for newlyweds; a shivaree
berm - (n.) edge of the road, curb: an accepted alternative to "shoulder of the road"
carbon oil - (n.) kerosene
chipped ham - (n.) very thinly sliced chopped ham loaf for sandwiches (from a local brand name) (see chipped chopped ham)
city chicken - (n.) cubes of pork loin and/or veal on a short wooden skewer, breaded, then fried or baked
cupboard - (n.) closet
craw - (n.) crawfish
cruds, crudded milk, or cruddled milk - (n.) cottage cheese
diamond - (n.) town square
dippy - (adj.) appropriate for dipping into, such as gravy, coffee, egg yolks, etc. 
doll baby - (n.) complimentary term for an attractively childlike girl or woman (reversal of "baby doll")
drooth - (n.) drought
dupa - (n.) parental term (of Polish origin) for a child's backside
feature - (v.) to think about, understand, or imagine
grinnie - (n.) chipmunk
gumband - (n.) rubber band; elastic fastener
gutchies; or undergutchies (n.) term used to describe undergarments of any variety. 
hap - (n.) comfort; or, comforter or quilt:
hoagie - (n.) a sub (i.e., submarine sandwich; used throughout Pennsylvania)
jag - (v.) to prick, stab, or jab; to tease (often, jag off or jag around)
jagger - (n./adj.) any small, sharp-pointed object or implement, usually thorns, spines, and prickles (as in a jagger bush or "I got a jagger in my finger").
jaggerbush - (n.) briar
jagoff - (n.) an idiot, fool, or unlikeable person
jimmies - (n.) sprinkles
jumbo - (n.) bologna lunch meat
"Kennywood's open" - idiom used to inform someone that their fly is open ("Kennywood" referring to the Kennywood amusement park in West Mifflin, Pennsylvania)
Klondike - (n.) ice cream bar (from a local brand name)
 or  - (n.) variant pronunciation of kielbasa
monkey ball - (n.) fruit of the Maclura pomifera or monkey ball tree
n'at - et cetera; and so on; a "general extender"; literally, a contraction of "and (all) that"
neb - (v.) to pry into a conversation or argument intrusively or impertinently (this term and its derivatives are common to Pennsylvania, but especially southwestern Pennsylvania, from Scots-Irish English)
neb out -  to mind one's own business
neb-nose or nebby-nose (also nebshit) - (n.) the kind of person who is always poking into people's affairs; inquisitive person
nebby - (adj.) given to prying into the affairs of others; nosey; inquisitive
onion snow - (n.) early spring snow
redd up (also ret, rid, ridd, or redd out) - (v.) to tidy up, clean up, or clean out (a room, house, cupboard, etc.); to clean house, tidy up (hence v bl. redding up house-cleaning; tidying up)
reverend - (adj.) extreme; extraordinary, powerful
slippy - (adj.) slippery (from Scots-Irish English)
spicket - (n.) alternate pronunciation of spigot, specifically an outdoor faucet used to connect to a garden hose
Stillers - (n.) alternate pronunciation of the Pittsburgh Steelers
sweep - (v.) to vacuum
sweeper - (n.) vacuum cleaner (also used in Ohio and Indiana; from carpet sweeper)
tossle cap - (n.) knit hat designed to provide warmth in cold weather
trick - (n.) a job shift (as used in West-Central Pennsylvania)
yins, yinz, yunz, you'uns, or youns - (pronoun) plural of you (second-person personal plural pronoun from Scots-Irish English)

Grammar
All to mean all gone: When referring to consumable products, the word all has a secondary meaning: all gone. For example, the phrase the butter's all would be understood as "the butter is all gone." This likely derives from German.
"Positive anymore": In addition to the normal negative use of anymore it can also, as in the greater Midland U.S. dialect, be used in a positive sense to mean "these days" or "nowadays". An example is "I wear these shoes a lot anymore". While in Standard English anymore must be used as a negative polarity item (NPI), some speakers in Pittsburgh and throughout the Midland area do not have this restriction. This is somewhat common in both the Midland regions (Montgomery 1989) and in northern Maryland (Frederick, Hagerstown, and Westminster), likely of Scots-Irish origin (Montgomery 1999).
Reversed usage of leave and let: Examples of this include "Leave him go outside" and "Let the book on the table". Leave is used in some contexts in which, in standard English, let would be used; and vice versa. Used in Southwestern Pennsylvania and elsewhere, this is either Pennsylvania Dutch or Scots-Irish.
"Need, want, or like + past participle": Examples of this include "The car needs washed", "The cat wants petted", and "Babies like cuddled". More common constructions are "The grass needs cutting" or "The grass needs to be cut" or "Babies like cuddling" or "Babies like to be cuddled"; "The car needs washing" or "The car needs to be washed"; and "The cat wants petting" or "The cat wants to be petted." Found predominantly in the North Midland region, this is especially common in southwestern Pennsylvania (Murray, Frazer and Simon 1996; Murray and Simon 1999; Murray and Simon 2002). Need + past participle is the most common construction, followed by want + past participle, and then like + past participle. The forms are "implicationally related" to one another (Murray and Simon 2002). This means the existence of a less common construction from the list in a given location entails the existence of the more common ones there, but not vice versa. The constructions "like + past participle" and "need + past participle" are Scots-Irish (Murray, Frazer, and Simon 1996; Murray and Simon 1999; Montgomery 2001; Murray and Simon 2002). While Adams argues that "want + past participle" could be from Scots-Irish or German, it seems likely that this construction is Scots-Irish, as Murray and Simon (1999 and 2002) claim. like and need + past participle are Scots-Irish, the distributions of all three constructions are implicationally related, the area where they are predominantly found is most heavily influenced by Scots-Irish, and a related construction, "want + directional adverb", as in "The cat wants out", is Scots-Irish.
"Punctual whenever": "Whenever" is often used to mean "at the time that" (Montgomery 2001). An example is "My mother, whenever she passed away, she had pneumonia." A punctual descriptor refers to the use of the word for "a onetime momentary event rather than in its two common uses for a recurrent event or a conditional one". This Scots-Irish usage is found in the Midlands and the South.

Notable examples of lifelong speakers
 John Kasich
 Pat McAfee
 Art Rooney
 Dan Rooney
 Fred Rogers

See also
 Jagoff
 Midland American English
 Pennsylvania Dutch English
 Philadelphia accent
 Pittsburgh Dad
 Regional vocabularies of American English
 Yinztagram

References

Bibliography

Further reading

Kurath, H. (1949). Western Pennsylvania. A Word Geography of the Eastern United States. Ann Arbor, University of Michigan Press: 35-36.
Kurath, H. and R. I. McDavid. (1961). Western Pennsylvania. The pronunciation of English in the Atlantic United States. Ann Arbor, University of Michigan Press: 17-18.
Labov, W., S. Ash and C. Boberg. (2005). The atlas of North American English: phonetics, phonology, and sound change. Mouton de Gruyter.
Layton, N. N. (1999). The dialect of western Pennsylvania: evaluation of ten sounds. Master's thesis. Goteburg, Sweden: University of Goteburg.
Macauley, R. (1985). The narrative skills of a Scottish coal miner. Focus on: Scotland. Ed. by M. Gorlach. Philadelphia, John Benjamins: 101-124.

Montgomery, M. B. (1997). A tale of two Georges: the language of Irish Indian traders in colonial North America. Focus on: Ireland. Ed. by J. Kallen. Philadelphia, John Benjamins. 21: 227-254.

Simpson, J.A. and E.S.C. Weiner, Eds. (1991). Compact Oxford English Dictionary. 2nd Ed. Cambridge: Oxford UP.
 
 Thomas, E. (2001). An acoustic analysis of vowel variation in New World English. Durham, Duke UP.
 Wisnosky, M. (2003). 'Pittsburghese' in Pittsburgh humor. Master's thesis in Linguistics. Pittsburgh, University of Pittsburgh.

External links
 Pittsburgh Speech & Society, University of Pittsburgh
 "It's Not the Sights, It's the Sounds", New York Times article, March 17, 2006 /9"Pittsburgh is the Galapagos Islands of American dialect")
 "American Varieties: Steel Town Speak", part of PBS's Do You Speak American?
 Pittsburghese: Welcome!, Duquesne University
 Pittsburghese.com

American English
American slang
City colloquials
Culture of Pittsburgh
Scotch-Irish American culture in Pennsylvania
Working-class culture in Pennsylvania
Languages of Pennsylvania